Seal Online (씰 온라인) is a massively multiplayer online role-playing game, originally developed by the Korean company Grigon Entertainment. In February 2007 Publisher YNK acquired the rights for the game, and in January 2009, the game was moved to the internal studio YNK Games. As of 7 February 2008, official versions of the game are available in South Korea, Japan, Taiwan, Thailand, Indonesia, Brazil, and the United States.

The English version of Seal Online was expected to be released in Quarter 3 of 2005 when Grigon Entertainment announced that there would be an English version of Seal Online. An English website was made by them. However within two months, the site closed and there was no more news of an English translated version of the game.

After two years, a website was created for Seal Online. It had a post announcing the arrival of Seal Online in English to the United States. The English Seal Online was finally released on 19 November 2007 at 8pm EST by YNK Interactive.

Gameplay 
Seal Online is mostly a point-and-click MMORPG; movement, combat, and many other commands are all controlled by mouse, though the combo system is done with the A, S, and D keys. The player can choose from 7 different classes to start with. However, if the player chooses to start with the Beginner, he/she can choose to job change into the other 6 classes when he reaches Level 10.  21 additional new classes were added in early 2009. The game experienced a server wipe on 27 September 2010 bringing all players back to level 1.

Seal Online's travel system uses a method called 'Warp Gates'. These gates, located in various towns, allow the player to move to other maps. Players may use scrolls, set revive points, use the Wagon Driver NPC, or just type out a Teleport command for a small fee to warp to different maps.

Players can learn skills to trade, open or join a guild after completing a quest, open a chat room, create a party to fight monsters more effectively, open an in-game bank account to hold or collect more items and money, nurture a pet, do quests, and fish.

Seal Online's level up system uses a point method. Skills level up with skill points. Each time a player levels up, they receive a set number of skill points and status points, which they then may use to strengthen their character.

The Combo System is more complicated than most other MMORPGs. As a player attacks an enemy, the XP bar fills up. Once the bar is halfway filled, the player can start a combo by pressing the game's combo buttons. After starting a combo, players must press a combination of buttons. Combos do more damage than normal attacks, and are executed faster.

Classes

There are 9 classes: Knight, Jester, Mage, Craftsman, Warrior, Priest, Beginner, Hunter, Cook.

There are two second Classes for each first classes that can be chosen after reaching level 150.
Knight: Defender or Regenade
Jester: Gambler or Assassin
Mage: Ice Wizard or Fire Wizard
Craftsman: Demolitionist or Artisan
Warrior: Swordmaster or Berserker
Priest: Apostle or Templar
Hunter: Gunner or Archer
Cook: Chef or Food Fighter

Server shutdown
After offering entertainment for many years, many servers were shut down by their local server company. Servers in Indonesia and Thailand, for example, were closed in mid-2017.

References

External links
 

2003 video games
Massively multiplayer online role-playing games
Video games developed in South Korea
Free online games
Windows games
Windows-only games